Rationes seminales (Latin, from the Greek λόγοι σπερματικοὶ or logoi spermatikoi), translated variously as germinal or causal principles, primordial reasons, original factors, seminal reasons or virtues, or seedlike principles, is a theological theory on the origin of species. It is the doctrine that God created the world in seed form, with certain potentialities, which then developed or unfolded accordingly over time; what appears to be change is simply the realization of the preexisting potentialities. The theory is a metaphor of the growth of a plant: much like a planted seed eventually develops into a tree, so when God created the world he planted rationes seminales, from which all life sprung. It is intended to reconcile the belief that God created all things, with the evident fact that new things are constantly developing.

The roots of this idea can be found within the Greek philosophy of the Stoics and Neoplatonism. 
The idea was incorporated into Christian thought through the writings of authors such as  Justin the Martyr, Athenagoras of Athens, Tertullian, Gregory of Nyssa, Augustine of Hippo, Bonaventure, Albertus Magnus, and Roger Bacon. Contemporary theistic evolutionists look to this doctrine for inspiration on the consistency of Judeo-Christian creation and the modern biological theory of evolution.

See also
 History of evolutionary thought

References

Principles
Metaphysics of religion
Religious philosophical concepts